Bo or Bó as a surname may refer to:

 Achillina Bo, birth name of Lina Bo Bardi (1914–1992), Italian-born Brazilian modernist architect
 Armando Bó (1914–1981), Argentine film actor, director, producer, screenwriter and score composer, father of Víctor Bó
 Armando Bó (screenwriter), Argentine Oscar-winning screenwriter and film director, son of Víctor Bó
 Carlo Bo (1911–2001), Italian politician and IULM founder
 Charles Maung Bo (born 1948), Burmese cardinal and current archbishop of the Roman Catholic Archdiocese of Yangon
 Conrad Bo (born 1972), South African artist and founder of The Superstroke Art Movement
 Eddie Bo (1930–2009), American singer and pianist
 Htun Aeindra Bo (born 1966), Burmese actress and singer
  (1919–1999), Danish architect, Royal Danish Academy of Fine Arts professor 
 Lars Bo (1924–1999), Danish artist and writer
 Mario Bò (1912–2003), Italian footballer
 Morten Bo (born 1945), Danish photographer
 Theinkha Bo (13th Century), Burmese Prince of Binnaka
 Víctor Bó (born 1943), Argentine actor and film producer, son of Armando Bó

See also 
 Daniel Dal Bo (born 1987), Argentine sprint canoeist
 Marcial Di Fonzo Bo (born 1968), Argentine actor and theatre director
 Bo (Chinese surname), several Chinese family names
 Bő (genus), Hungarian medieval clan
 Bø (disambiguation), which includes people with the surname
 Beau (name), given name and surname

Italian-language surnames